Southeast Iowa Regional Airport  is a public airport located two miles southwest of Burlington, in Des Moines County, Iowa. It is owned by the Southeast Iowa Regional Airport Authority which includes representatives from the city of Burlington, the city of West Burlington, and Des Moines County. The airport is used for general aviation and sees one airline, a service subsidized by the federal government's Essential Air Service program at a cost of $1,917,566 (per year).

The National Plan of Integrated Airport Systems for 2021–2025 categorized it as a non-primary commercial service airport (between 2,500 and 10,000 enplanements per year).

History 
The airport launched in 1929 when the Burlington City Council adopted a resolution to establish a Municipal Airport on an "L"-shaped  sod field on Summer Street in Burlington, Iowa. Scheduled passenger service started in 1931 when the National Air Transport company added Burlington to its Chicago to Kansas City route. National's two ten-seat Ford Trimotors made two daily flights to Burlington. Braniff Airlines began two daily departures to Kansas City in 1944; in 1956 Braniff was replaced by Ozark, which pulled out of Burlington in 1982.

In 1947 a long-range airport development plan was created for building a Quonset hut administrative building, a U-shaped entrance road with parking, a gasoline service station for aircraft, a tourist court with recreational facilities, a maintenance building and hangars.

The airport's hours of operation were extended in 1959 when runway lights were installed, enabling flights to take off and land at night. In 1967 an aviation easement allowed the north-south runway to be widened and extended . The terminal building was remodeled in 1989.

In 1996 the name was changed from Burlington Regional Airport to Southeast Iowa Regional Airport. SIRA employs about 20 people. Passengers report that the laid-back, inviting atmosphere at the airport reminds them of the TV show Wings.

Facilities
The airport covers 537 acres (217 ha) at an elevation of 698 feet (213 m). It has two runways: 18/36 is 6,102 by 100 feet (1,860 x 30 m) asphalt and 12/30 is 5,351 by 100 feet (1,631 x 30 m) concrete.

For the year ending July 30, 2019 the airport had 20,172 aircraft operations, an average of 55 per day: 74% general aviation, 16% air taxi, 9% airline and less than 1% military. In December 2021, there were 32 aircraft based at this airport: 28 single-engine, 2 multi-engine, 1 jet and 1 helicopter.

Airline and destinations 

Scheduled passenger service:

Statistics

Incidents 
On November 19, 1996 United Express Flight 5925 (operated by Great Lakes Airlines) departed Burlington bound for Quincy, IL. It later collided with a King Air near the runway 4/13 intersection at Quincy Regional Airport. The probable cause was that the King Air pilots did not monitor the Common Traffic Advisory Frequency due to Quincy having very low air traffic. 12 people died in the accident; seven were employees of Dresser Industries in Burlington.

On May 30, 2013, winds from a severe thunderstorm damaged and destroyed several hangars. No one was injured.

References

Other sources 

 Essential Air Service documents (Docket OST-2001-8731) from the U.S. Department of Transportation:
 Order 2005-6-14: re-selecting RegionsAir, Inc. d/b/a American Connection, formerly known as Corporate Airlines, to provide subsidized essential air service (EAS) at each of the above communities (Burlington, IA; Cape Girardeau, MO; Ft. Leonard Wood, MO; Jackson, TN; Marion/Herrin, IL; Owensboro, KY; Kirksville, MO) for a new two-year period from June 1, 2005, through May 31, 2007, for a combined annual subsidy of $7,306,249. Also by this order, the Department is terminating the show-cause proceeding tentatively terminating subsidy at Kirksville, Missouri, as RegionsAir's selected proposal is below the $200-per-passenger cap.
 Order 2007-3-5: selecting Big Sky Transportation Co., d/b/a Big Sky Airlines, and Great Lakes Aviation, Ltd. to provide subsidized essential air service (EAS) at the above communities (Burlington, IA; Cape Girardeau, MO; Fort Leonard Wood, MO; Jackson, TN; Marion/Herrin, IL, Owensboro, KY) for the two-year period from June 1, 2007, through May 31, 2009, using 19-seat Beech 1900D turboprop aircraft as follows: Big Sky at Cape Girardeau, Jackson, and Owensboro for a combined annual subsidy of $3,247,440; and Great Lakes at Burlington, Fort Leonard Wood, and Marion/Herrin for a combined annual subsidy of $2,590,461.
 Order 2009-10-13: selecting Hyannis Air Service, Inc. d/b/a Cape Air, to provide subsidized essential air service (EAS) at Marion/Herrin, Quincy, and Cape Girardeau, for a two-year period beginning when Cape Air inaugurates full EAS at each of the three communities and ending at the close of the 24th month thereafter, at a combined annual subsidy rate of $5,469,768 ($2,053,783 for Marion/Herrin, $1,946,270 for Quincy, and $1,469,715 for Cape Girardeau). The Department is selecting Multi-Aero, Inc. d/b/a Air Choice One to provide subsidized EAS at Decatur, Illinois, and Burlington, Iowa, for a two-year period beginning when it inaugurates full EAS and ending at the close of the 24th month thereafter, at a combined annual subsidy of $5,253,644 ($3,082,403 for Decatur and $2,171,241 for Burlington). The Department is selecting Great Lakes Aviation, Ltd. (Great Lakes) to provide subsidized EAS at Fort Leonard Wood, Missouri, for the two-year period from November 1, 2009, through October 31, 2011, at an annual subsidy of $1,292,906.
 Order 2011-12-17: re-selecting Multi-Aero, Inc. d/b/a Air Choice One to provide essential air service (EAS) at Burlington, Iowa, and Decatur, Illinois, at a combined annual subsidy rate of $4,727,307 ($1,976,872 for Burlington and $2,750,435 for Decatur), for a one-year period from February 1, 2012, through January 31, 2013.

External links 
 Southeast Iowa Regional Airport, official website
 
 

Airports in Iowa
Essential Air Service
Buildings and structures in Burlington, Iowa
Transportation buildings and structures in Des Moines County, Iowa